The 2022 Dubai World Cup was a horse race run at Meydan Racecourse in Dubai on 26 March 2022. It was the 26th running of the race. The total prize money for the race was $12 million, with the winner receiving $7.2 million.

The race was won by Country Grammer, trained by Bob Baffert and ridden by Frankie Dettori.

Race

Entries

A field of 11 runners was declared for the race, including Breeders' Cup Dirt Mile and Pegasus World Cup winner Life Is Good. Other notable entries included Louisiana Derby and Pennsylvania Derby winner Hot Rod Charlie, and Country Grammer and Midnight Bourbon, who finished second and third respectively in the 2022 Saudi Cup.

Only 10 horses started the race, after Grocer Jack was declared a non-runner.

Result

References

External links
Dubai Racing Club
Emirates Racing Authority

Dubai World Cup
Dubai World Cup
Dubai World Cup
Dubai World Cup